Port of Whitman Business Air Center,  is a public use airport located 3 miles (5 km) southwest of the central business district of Colfax, a city in Whitman County, Washington, United States. It is included in the Federal Aviation Administration (FAA) National Plan of Integrated Airport Systems for 2017–2021, in which it is categorized as a basic general aviation facility.

This airport is assigned location identifier S94 by the FAA but, unlike most airports in the United States, has no designation from the International Air Transport Association (IATA).

Facilities and aircraft 
Port of Whitman Business Air Center covers an area of 64 acres (26 ha) at an elevation of 2,181 feet (665 m) above mean sea level. It has one runway: 8/26 is 3,209 by 60 feet (978 x 18 m) with an asphalt surface.

In 2016, the airport had 15,000 aircraft operations, an average of 41 per day: all general aviation.

In January 2018, there were 15 aircraft based at this airport: 13 single-engine, 1 multi-engine, and 1 ultra-light.

See also
List of airports in Washington

References

External links 
 Airport page for the Port of Whitman County website

 AirportGuide airport information for S94

 Airports in Washington (state)
Transportation buildings and structures in Whitman County, Washington